Morengo is a comune (municipality) in the Province of Bergamo in the Italian region of Lombardy, located about  east of Milan and about  south of Bergamo.

Morengo borders the following municipalities: Bariano, Brignano Gera d'Adda, Caravaggio, Cologno al Serio, Martinengo, Pagazzano, Romano di Lombardia.

Twin towns
 Podensac, France, since 2018

References

External links
 Official website